Aapan Yana Pahilat Ka is a 1992 Indian Marathi-language romantic drama film directed by Prakash Bhende and produced by Uma Bhende. Aapan Yana Pahilat Ka was released on April, 1992.

Cast 

The movie stars Vikram Gokhale, Girish Pardeshi, Hemangi Rao, Uma Bhende, Prakash Bhende, Upendra Date, Resham Tipnis and others.

Soundtrack
The music score has been provided and composed by Dattaraj.

References

External links 
  Review - www.filmorbit.com

1992 films
1990s Marathi-language films